Dehnow (also Romanized as Deh-e Now and Deh-i-Nau; also known as Dehnow-e Konjak) is a village in Abu ol Verdi Rural District, Hakhamanish District, Pasargad County, Fars Province, Iran. At the 2006 census, its population was 230, in 65 families.

References 

Populated places in Pasargad County